Nova Scotia (Board of Censors) v McNeil, [1978] 2 S.C.R. 662 is a famous pre-Charter decision from the Supreme Court of Canada on freedom of expression and the criminal law power under the Constitution Act, 1867. The film censorship laws of the province of Nova Scotia were challenged on the basis that it constituted criminal law which could only be legislated by the federal government.  The Court held that though the censorship laws had a moral dimension to it, the laws did not have any prohibition or penalty required in a criminal law.

Background
The Amusement Regulation Board of Nova Scotia, created under the Theatre and Amusement Act, banned the film Last Tango in Paris from being shown in the province. McNeil, a journalist, attempted to challenge the law on the basis that it was a constitutionally invalid law.

The issue before the Supreme Court was whether the regulation of morality alone constitutes a criminal law. In a five to four decision the Court held that the law was concerning property and civil rights under section 92(13) of the B.N.A. Act and not criminal law.

Reasons of the court
Ritchie J., writing for the majority found that the pith and substance of the Act concerned the "regulation, supervision and control" of film, a form of private property, in the province. Consequently, the law was strictly a matter of Property and Civil Rights, a matter that was in the exclusive jurisdiction of the province. Further, Ritchie applied the definition of Criminal law from the Margarine Reference case which required that a criminal law must concern the public interest and must consist of a prohibition with a penalty. Ritchie found that there was no clear prohibition because the law did not provide details on what was prohibited, rather, it left it to the discretion of the board.

Dissent
Laskin CJ., in dissent, found that the law had no connection with Property and Civil Rights. Laskin identified the law as colourable. In form it concerned property but in substance it concerned the regulation of "taste". He noted how the province had already unsuccessfully attempted to prosecute the distributor of the film under the obscenity laws of the Criminal Code, and saw this as another attempt at the same goal.

See also
 List of Supreme Court of Canada cases (Laskin Court)

External links
 

Standing (law)
Supreme Court of Canada cases
Canadian freedom of expression case law
Canadian federalism case law
1978 in Canadian case law
Censorship in Canada
Film censorship in Canada
Film controversies in Canada